Stigmella incognitella is a moth of the family Nepticulidae. It is found in all of Europe except Iceland, Ireland, Norway and Bulgaria.

The wingspan is 5–6 mm. Adults are on wing from July to November.

The larvae feed on Malus baccata, Malus domestica, Malus floribunda and Malus sylvatica. They mine the leaves of their host plant. The mine consists of a small compact corridor, widening towards the end. The frass is concentrated in a broad, irregular central line.

External links
 Fauna Europaea
 bladmineerders.nl
 
 

Nepticulidae
Moths described in 1855
Moths of Europe
Taxa named by Gottlieb August Wilhelm Herrich-Schäffer